Anna Maria Mori (born Pula, 12 April 1936) is an Italian novelist and journalist. Jointly with Nelida Milani, she was the recipient of the Rapallo Carige Prize for Bora in 1999.

References

Italian women novelists
20th-century Italian women writers
20th-century Italian novelists
20th-century Italian journalists
Italian women journalists
21st-century Italian novelists
21st-century Italian women writers
21st-century Italian journalists
People from Pula
1936 births
Living people